The Heavenly Play is a 1942 Swedish drama film directed by Alf Sjöberg.

Plot
The young peasants Mats and Marit are about to marry when a disease breaks out in their village. Marit gets accused of being a witch and sentenced to death. After she has been burnt alive Mats leaves the village and seeks a way to make God sending Marit back from heaven onto earth. He fails and loses his personal integrity. Marlit has to ask God to intervene before the devil can take Mats. God shows mercy by reuniting Mats and Marit in heaven.

Cast
 Rune Lindström as Mats Ersson
 Eivor Landström as Marit Knutsdotter
 Anders Henrikson as Our Lord
 Holger Löwenadler as King Salomo
 Gudrun Brost as King Salomo's mistress
 Arnold Sjöstrand as Juvas Anders, painter
 Emil Fjellström as Gammel-Jerk
 Nils Gustafsson as blind man at the road
 Hugo Björne as prophet Elias
 Torsten Winge as Jonas
 Erik Hell as Jon Persson
 Åke Claesson as Profet Jeremiah (as Åke Claeson)
 Björn Berglund as Josef
 Inga-Lilly Forsström as Virgin Mary (as Inga Lilly Forsström)
 Lisskulla Jobs as country woman
 Anita Björk as Anna Jesper

References

External links
 

1942 films
Swedish drama films
1940s Swedish-language films
1942 drama films
Swedish black-and-white films
Films directed by Alf Sjöberg
1940s Swedish films